WVIJ (91.7 FM) is a radio station broadcasting an oldies format. It is licensed to Port Charlotte, Florida, United States. The station is currently owned by Lake Erie College of Osteopathic Medicine, Inc.

References

External links

VIJ
Oldies radio stations in the United States